Saranga, is a 1961 Bollywood film starring Sudesh Kumar and Jayshree Gadkar, and directed by Dhirubhai Desai, produced by Dhirubhai Desai and Kanjibhai Rathod.

Cast
 Jayshree Gadkar as Saranga
 Sudesh Kumar as Prince Sadabaksh
 B. M. Vyas as	Nagar Seth
 Nilofar as Nagar Sethani 
 Niranjan Sharma as Raja of Ambavati
 Sadiq	as Gyanchand
 Jankidas as Nagar Seth's Munim 
 Parsuram as Senapati 
 Jaya Devi	as	Ganga Maa

Soundtrack
All the film songs were composed by music director Sardar Malik and lyrics were penned by Bharat Vyas.

References

External links

1961 films
1960s Hindi-language films
Films scored by Sardar Malik
Films directed by Dhirubhai Desai